This is the third season of Hungarian version of The X Factor.  
 
The first promo for applying was broadcast in April, 2012. Nóra Ördög returned to host the show. RTL KLUB confirmed the judges on 25 June, all of the four judges would be back for season 3.   
The show started the Fall of 2012. The producers promised it would be the best and the biggest season of the show.  In this series the production used the new X Faktor logo and styling and also changed the judges place on the panel. 
 
First time it would be the rival show of TV2 (Hungary)'s Voice. The Voice would be a real rival, because Miklós Malek's sister Andrea Malek was joining to the Voice's line up. X Faktor is the most viewed talent show in Hungarian TV history.

The first promo was aired on 9 August. The channel announced 16 August, that X-Faktor would return on 1 September 2012.

Auditions

The auditions started in the summer of 2012, with more than 5,000 candidates for the third series in Hungary. The judges auditions took place in Budapest on 25–28 June. This is the first time when the judges' auditions take more than one day.

Bootcamp
The Bootcamp stage of the show also took place in Budapest. Some 130 acts were invited for singing. The taping of the session started 16 July, and finished 20 July. One of the judges Ildikó Keresztes, said it was a really hard, but also a really dramatic Bootcamp. 
The Bootcamp was aired on 29 and 30 September. 
On the first day the 130 hopefuls sang a song in groups. The songs were chosen by the judges. At the end of the day 30 acts were sent home. 
On the second day, the contestants has a dance lesson, the judges saw the rehearsal, and after that the contestants of the four category (Girls, Boys, Groups and Over 28s) made a presentation of their dancing knowledge. At the end of the day, the judges revealed the 50 acts, who went through for the last day of the Bootcamp. 
On the third day, the contestantas sang live for an audience and the judges. The hopefuls chose a song, what they wanted to sing. At the end of the day, the judges revealed the 25 remaining acts for the Judges' Homes. the girls category has an extra, 7th acts. And the judges find out, which  category will they mentoring.

Judges' houses
At this stage of the competition each judge mentored six acts. Each judge had help from a guest judge to choose their final acts.
Keresztes was helped by Balázs Fehér, Malek by Gabi Tóth, Nagy by Tamás Molnár, and Geszti by Titusz Tiszttartó. Contestants performed one song for their respective judge. Each judge and their guest eliminated three acts, leaving twelve remaining. The judges' houses stage was broadcast in two episodes on 6 and 7 October 2012.

The thirteen eliminated acts were:
Boys: Emota Bálint Ekanem, Csaba Meggyes, Szilárd Nagy
Girls: Réka Balla, Dóra Danics, Kinga Jáger, Loretta Pál
Over 28s: Sándor Horváth, Zsolt Ernő Kiss, Erika Kovács
Groups: ByTheWay, Soldiers, Wonderfool

Contestants
Twelve acts go through to this stage of the show.

Key:
 – Winner
 – Runner-up
 – Third Place

Results summary

{|
|-
| – mentored by Miklós Malek (Girls)
|| – Bottom two
|-
| – mentored by Péter Geszti (Boys)
| – Most public votes  that week
|-
| – mentored by Feró Nagy (Groups)
|-
| – mentored by Ildikó Keresztes (Over 28s)
|}

Live Shows

Week 1 (13 October)

Theme: Songs chosen by the contestants

Judge's vote to eliminate
 Nagy: Andrea Kvaka
 Malek: Zoltán Fehér
 Keresztes: Andrea Kvaka
 Geszti: Andrea Kvaka

Week 2 (20 October)

Judge's vote to eliminate
 Geszti: P.J.Z.
 Malek: P.J.Z.
 Keresztes: P.J.Z.
 Nagy: Lass Bea

Week 3 (27 October)

Theme: Movie themes

Judge's vote to eliminate
 Malek: Spirit
 Geszti: Spirit
 Nagy: Zoltán Fehér
 Keresztes: Spirit

Week 4 (3 November)

Theme: Life is beautiful

Judge's vote to eliminate
 Malek: Bea Lass
 Geszti: László Kovács
 Nagy: Bea Lass
 Keresztes: László Kovács

As both Acts got 2 Votes, they went to deadlock and Bea Lass was eliminated.

Week 5 (10 November)

Judge's vote to eliminate
 Geszti: László Kovács
 Keresztes: Zoltán Fehér
 Nagy: Zoltán Fehér
 Malek: Zoltán Fehér

Week 6 (17 November)

Judge's vote to eliminate
 Geszti: Like
 Keresztes: Like
 Nagy: Dávid Szabó
 Malek: Like

Week 7 (24 November)

Judge's vote to eliminate
 Geszti: Krisztián Zámbó
 Keresztes: no need to vote
 Nagy: Krisztián Zámbó
 Malek: Krisztián Zámbó

Week 8 (1 December)

Theme: One English song & One Hungarian song

Judge's vote to eliminate
 Geszti: László Kovács
 Keresztes: Dávid Szabó
 Nagy: László Kovács
 Malek: László Kovács

Week 9 (8 December)

Theme: One English song & One Hungarian song

Judge's vote to eliminate
 Geszti: Adél Csobot
 Keresztes: Adél Csobot
 Nagy: Dávid Szabó
 Malek: Dávid Szabó

As both Acts got 2 Votes, they went to deadlock and Dávid Szabó was eliminated.

Week 10 (15/16 December)

Saturday Night 

Theme: One with a surprise duet partner
Duets:
Tímea Antal and Tibor Kasza
Gergő Oláh and Bebe
Adél Csobot and Bery

Sunday Night 

Theme: Finalist's favourite previously performed song, one with a surprise duet partner, Winner Song
Duets:
Tímea Antal and Tibor Kocsis
Gergő Oláh and Csaba Vastag

Hungarian television shows
Hungary 03
2012 Hungarian television series debuts
2012 Hungarian television series endings
2010s Hungarian television series
2012 Hungarian television seasons